Badgers Mount is a village and civil parish in the Sevenoaks District of Kent, England It is located 3.6 miles south east of Orpington and 5.6 miles north west of Sevenoaks, adjacent to the Kent border with Greater London.

Transport

Rail
The nearest National Rail station to Badgers Mount is Knockholt station, located 1 mile away.

Buses
Badgers Mount is served by Go Coach route 3 (Mondays to Fridays), connecting it with Orpington and Sevenoaks.

References

External links
Badgers Mount village website

Villages in Kent
Civil parishes in Kent
Sevenoaks District